Thy Geekdom Con is a multi-genre convention held annually at the Greater Philadelphia Expo Center at Oaks, PA. The convention has a wide array of activities that feature panels, live performances, video game tournaments, artist alley, dealers room, and celebrity guests.

Programming

The convention typically offers panels, workshops, and live performances. In past years there have been panels on comic books, video gaming, costuming, and other topics within popular culture. The live performance portion has had live bands, DJs, hypnotists, Rocky Horror Picture Show performances, karaoke, and Love Live! dance performances.

The video game area consists of both free play and tournaments. Past video game tournaments have consisted of Super Smash Bros., Tekken, Injustice: Gods Among Us, Marvel Vs. Capcom, Mortal Kombat, and Dragon Ball FighterZ There is also an area dedicated to tabletop games where board games and RPGs are played.

Throughout the weekend celebrity guests sign autographs and host panels for the attendees.

History
The first convention was held on April 18 of 2015 in Glen Mills, PA. The following three conventions were held at varying venues in the Wilmington, Delaware area from November 2015 to November 2017. Each year the convention growing in both attendance and space used. The convention expanded to two days in 2017. Thy Geekdom Con would move to the Greater Philadelphia Expo Center and become a 3-day event in 2018. The move was to better accommodate the attendance the convention has drawn. In 2020 in the midst of the COVID-19 pandemic the convention was cancelled & deferred to 2021. The decisions to do so was to ensure the health and safety of the local community.

Event history

See also
List of multigenre conventions

References

External links

Thy Geekdom Con Website

Multigenre conventions
Recurring events established in 2015
2015 establishments in Pennsylvania
Annual events in Pennsylvania
Festivals in Pennsylvania
Tourist attractions in Montgomery County, Pennsylvania
Conventions in Pennsylvania